The 2009 Zuiderduin Masters was a British Darts Organisation darts tournament that took place on 11–13 December in Egmond aan Zee, Netherlands. It was the 11th staging of the event, and the last tournament to be staged that year.

The competition saw Darryl Fitton hit a nine-dart finish during his quarter-final match against Ross Montgomery, becoming the first player to achieve the feat in the Zuiderduin's history.  Fitton went on to win the tournament, with a 4 sets to 2 win over Martin Adams in the final, becoming the third Englishman to claim the title.  The women's event was won by Wales' Julie Gore, who triumphed against Tricia Wright 2 sets to 0.  Gore's three dart average of 86.07 was the highest recognized average for a ladies player in a BDO major, since Anastasia Dobromyslova's 81.54 average in the 2008 World Championship.

Results

Men's tournament

Group stage
all matches best of 9 legs.P = Played; W = Won; L = Lost; LF = Legs for; LA = Legs against; +/- = Leg difference; Pts = Points

Group A

Mark Barilli 78.03 3-5 Martin Atkins 79.47 
Tony O'Shea 85.83 4-5 Mark Barilli 87.39 
Tony O'Shea 93.36 4-5 Martin Atkins 88.23 

Group B

John Henderson 101.91 5-2 Ian White 84.75 
Alan Norris 90.75 5-3 Ian White 83.19 
Alan Norris 84.78 5-4 John Henderson 76.62 

Group C

Ross Montgomery 91.29 5-4 Henny van der Ster 84.12 
Ted Hankey 86.97 5-1 Henny van der Ster 74.70 
Ted Hankey 90.18 3-5 Ross Montgomery 83.64 

Group D

Dave Prins 85.71 5-4 Willy van de Wiel 85.23 
Darryl Fitton 98.49 5-3 Willy van de Wiel 83.85 
Darryl Fitton 89.40 5-4 Dave Prins 76.26 

Group E

Robert Wagner 88.89 5-3 Mareno Michels 78.57 
Martin Adams 104.46 5-1 Mareno Michels 88.56 
Martin Adams 98.28 5-1 Robert Wagner 86.61 

Group F

Gino Vos 85.50 5-3 Joey ten Berge 85.32 
Steve West 89.19 5-3 Joey ten Berge 91.08 
Steve West 88.38 5-3 Gino Vos 92.67 

Group G

Ron Meulenkamp 76.59 0-5 Gary Robson 84.45 
John Walton 82.77 5-1 Ron Meulenkamp 86.49 
John Walton 85.71 4-5 Gary Robson 85.47 

Group H

Brian Woods 88.56 4-5 Tony West 82.62 
Scott Waites 92.49 5-4 Brian Woods 84.81 
Scott Waites 94.92 5-2 Tony West 79.47

Knockout stages

Women's tournament

Zuiderduin Masters
Zuiderduin Masters
Finder Darts Masters